Primovula is a genus of sea snails, marine gastropod mollusks in the family Ovulidae, the false cowries.

Species 
Species within the genus Primovula include:
Primovula astra Omi & Iino, 2005
Primovula beckeri  (Sowerby, 1900)
Primovula fulguris (Azuma & Cate, 1971)
Primovula panthera  Omi, 2008
Primovula roseomaculata (Schepman, 1909)
Primovula rosewateri (Cate, 1973)
Primovula santacarolinensis Cate, 1978
Primovula tadashigei (Cate, 1973)
Primovula tropica Schilder, 1931
Primovula uvula Cate, 1978
Species brought into synonymy
Primovula adriatica Allan, 1956: synonym of Pseudosimnia adriatica (Sowerby, 1828)
Primovula aureola Fehse, 2002: synonym of Crenavolva aureola (Fehse, 2002)
Primovula azumai Cate, 1970: synonym of Dentiovula azumai (Cate, 1970)
Primovula bellica Cate, 1973: synonym of Cuspivolva bellica (Cate, 1973)
Primovula bellocqae Cardin, 1997: synonym of Pseudosimnia juanjosensii (Pérez & Gómez, 1987)
Primovula carnea (Poiret, 1789): synonym of Pseudosimnia carnea (Poiret, 1789)
Primovula cavanaghi Allan, 1956: synonym of Globovula cavanaghi (Iredale, 1931)
Primovula celzardi Fehse, 2008: synonym of Cuspivolva celzardi (Fehse, 2008)
Primovula coarctaca Schilder, 1941: synonym of Prosimnia semperi (Weinkauff, 1881)
Primovula colobica Azuma & Cate, 1971: synonym of Dentiovula colobica (Azuma & Cate, 1971)
Primovula concinna Schilder, 1932: synonym of Procalpurnus semistriatus (Pease, 1862)
Primovula dautzenbergi Schilder, 1931: synonym of Diminovula dautzenbergi (Schilder, 1931)
Primovula diaphana Liltved, 1987: synonym of Pseudosimnia diaphana (Liltved, 1987)
Primovula dondani Cate, 1964: synonym of Serratovolva dondani (Cate, 1964)
Primovula dubia Cate, 1973: synonym of Primovula fulguris (Azuma & Cate, 1971)
Primovula formosa Schilder, 1941: synonym of Crenavolva traillii (A. Adams, 1855)
Primovula fructicum (Reeve, 1865): synonym of Prionovolva wilsoniana Cate, 1973: synonym of Prionovolva brevis (Sowerby, 1828)
Primovula fruticum (Reeve, 1865): synonym of Prionovolva brevis (Sowerby, 1828)
Primovula fumikoae Azuma & Cate, 1971: synonym of Sandalia triticea (Lamarck, 1810)
Primovula habui Cate, 1973: synonym of Cuspivolva habui (Cate, 1973)
Primovula helenae Cate, 1973: synonym of Cuspivolva helenae (Cate, 1973)
Primovula horai Cardin, 1994: synonym of Dentiovula horai (Cardin, 1994)
Primovula horimasarui Cate & Azuma, 1971: synonym of Hiatavolva coarctata (Sowerby in A. Adams & Reeve, 1848)
Primovula kurodai Cate & Azuma in Cate, 1973: synonym of Primovula roseomaculata (Schepman, 1909)
Primovula luna Omi, 2007: synonym of Pseudosimnia diaphana (Liltved, 1987)
Primovula mariae Schilder, 1941: synonym of Dentiovula mariae (Schilder, 1941)
Primovula mucronata Azuma & Cate, 1971: synonym of Cuspivolva mucronata (Azuma & Cate, 1971)
Primovula myrakeenae Azuma & Cate, 1971: synonym of Dentiovula azumai (Cate, 1970)
Primovula narinosa Cate, 1973: synonym of Cuspivolva narinosa (Cate, 1973)
Primovula oryza Omi & Clover, 2005: synonym of Dentiovula oryza (Omi & Clover, 2005)
Primovula platysia Cate, 1973: synonym of Cuspivolva platysia (Cate, 1973)
Primovula pyriformis Allan, 1956: synonym of Diminovula alabaster (Reeve, 1865)
Primovula rhodia Schilder, 1932: synonym of Simnia aperta (Sowerby, 1849)
Primovula rhodia (A. Adams, 1854): synonym of Sandalia triticea (Lamarck, 1810)
Primovula rutherfordiana Cate, 1973: synonym of Dentiovula rutherfordiana (Cate, 1973)
Primovula singularis Cate, 1973: synonym of Cuspivolva singularis (Cate, 1973)
Primovula sinomaris Cate, 1973: synonym of Primovula roseomaculata (Schepman, 1909)
Primovula solemi Cate, 1973: synonym of Pseudosimnia vanhyningi (M. Smith, 1940)
Primovula tigris Yamamoto, 1971: synonym of Cuspivolva tigris (Yamamoto, 1971)
Primovula tosaensis Azuma & Cate, 1971: synonym of Dissona tosaensis (Azuma & Cate, 1971)
Primovula tropica Schilder, 1941: synonym of Primovula tropica Schilder, 1931
Primovula vanhyningi M. Smith, 1940: synonym of Pseudosimnia vanhyningi (M. Smith, 1940)
Primovula virgo Azuma & Cate, 1971: synonym of Crenavolva virgo (Azuma & Cate, 1971)

References

 Gofas, S.; Le Renard, J.; Bouchet, P. (2001). Mollusca, in: Costello, M.J. et al. (Ed.) (2001). European register of marine species: a check-list of the marine species in Europe and a bibliography of guides to their identification. Collection Patrimoines Naturels, 50: pp. 180–213

Ovulidae